Georges Parent (15 September 1885 – 22 October 1918) was a French professional cyclist who was active between 1907 and 1914, predominantly in motor-paced racing. In this discipline he won the world championships in 1909–1911 and finished in third place in 1907.

Parent started biking while working as a delivery boy for a coffee shop. His first competition was a road race in 1903. He retired from cycling with the start of World War I, enlisted to the French Army and was wounded several times in battles. Three weeks before the end of the war, he died of the Spanish flu.

References

1885 births
1918 deaths
Deaths from Spanish flu
French male cyclists
Sportspeople from Savoie
UCI Track Cycling World Champions (men)
French track cyclists
French military personnel of World War I
Cyclists from Auvergne-Rhône-Alpes